Chingia is a genus of ferns belonging to the family Thelypteridaceae.

The species of this genus are found in Malesia.

Species

Species:

Chingia acutidens 
Chingia atrospinosa 
Chingia australis

References

Thelypteridaceae
Fern genera